The first competition weekend of the 2013–14 ISU Speed Skating World Cup was held in the Olympic Oval in Calgary, Alberta, Canada, from Friday, 8 November, until Sunday, 10 November 2013.

Two new world records were set during the weekend. On Saturday, Lee Sang-hwa of South Korea improved her own world record on 500 metres with a time of 36.74 seconds. A couple of hours later, the Dutch men's team – comprised by Koen Verweij, Jan Blokhuijsen and Sven Kramer – improved the team pursuit world record to 3:37.17.

There were also two world records for juniors; in the women's 3000 metres race on Friday, Antoinette de Jong of the Netherlands set a new world records for girls with a time of 4:00.56, and on Sunday, Kim Hyun-yung of South Korea did the same in the 1000 metres distance, with a time of 1:15.18.

Schedule
The detailed schedule of events:

All times are MST (UTC−7).

Medal summary

Men's events

Women's events

Standings
The top ten standings in the contested cups after the weekend. The top five nations in the team pursuit cups.

Men's cups
500 m

1000 m

1500 m

5000/10000 m

Team pursuit

Grand World Cup

Women's cups
500 m

1000 m

1500 m

3000/5000 m

Team pursuit

Grand World Cup

References

 
1
Isu World Cup, 2013-14, 1
Sport in Calgary
2013 in Alberta